The 1975 Cal State Hayward Pioneers football team represented California State University, Hayward—now known as California State University, East Bay—as a member of the Far Western Conference (FWC) during the 1975 NCAA Division II football season. Led by first-year head coach Tim Tierney, Cal State Hayward compiled an overall record of 0–10 with a mark of 0–5 in conference play, placing last out of six teams in the FWC. The team was outscored by its opponents 240 to 99 for the season. The Pioneers played home games at Pioneer Stadium in Hayward, California.

Schedule

Team players in the NFL
No Cal State Hayward Pioneers players were selected in the 1976 NFL Draft.

The following finished their college career in 1975, were not drafted, but played in the NFL.

References

Cal State Hayward
Cal State Hayward Pioneers football seasons
Cal State Hayward Pioneers football